Terence Joseph Brady (13 March 1939 – 29 September 2016) was an Irish actor and writer. He was married to fellow writer Charlotte Bingham, with whom he collaborated on several television series.

Brady was born in London to Irish parents, and went to Trinity College, Dublin, where he acted in student productions. He relocated to London in 1961, where he appeared in Beyond the Fringe and met Bingham. They were married in 1964 and had two children, Matthew and Candida.

Together, Brady and Bingham wrote for television series such as Upstairs, Downstairs, Yes, Honestly, No, Honestly and Pig in the Middle, and adapted Jilly Cooper's book Riders for the miniseries Riders (1993). As an actor, Brady appeared in TV programmes including Nanny, Three Rousing Tinkles, Mrs Thursday, and Z-Cars. As well as being an amateur musician, Brady had an interest in breeding racehorses and wrote a cookery column for the Daily Mail.

References

External links

1939 births
2016 deaths
20th-century Irish male actors
Irish male screenwriters
Irish male television actors
Male actors from London
Alumni of Trinity College Dublin
Irish emigrants to the United Kingdom
Daily Mail journalists